KSCA may refer to:

 The Karnataka State Cricket Association in India
 KSCA Stadium, a cricket ground in Belagavi, India
 KSCA (FM), a radio station (101.9 FM) licensed to Glendale, California, United States
 Knights of the Southern Cross Australia, a Catholic fraternal order
 Kilogram per square centimeter absolute, a unit of pressure
 Knight of the Society for Creative Anachronism, the order of chivalry peerage within the Society, a medieval re-creation organization
 Kalinga Institute of Industrial Technology School of Computer Application